Social judgment theory (SJT) is a self-persuasion theory proposed by Carolyn Sherif, Muzafer Sherif, and Carl Hovland, defined by Sherif and Sherif as the perception and evaluation of an idea by comparing it with current attitudes.  According to this theory, an individual weighs every new idea, comparing it with the individual's present point of view to determine where it should be placed on the attitude scale in an individual's mind.  SJT is the subconscious sorting out of ideas that occurs at the instant of perception.

Overview
Social judgment theory is a framework that studies human judgment. It is a meta-theory that directs research on cognitive perspective, which is how you perceive the situations. The psychophysical principle involved for example, is when a stimulus is farther away from one's judgmental anchor, a contrast effect is highly possible; when the stimulus is close to the anchor, an assimilation effect can happen. Social judgment theory represents an attempt to generalize psychophysical judgmental principles and the findings to the  social judgment. With the person's preferred position serving as the judgmental anchor, SJT is a theory that mainly focuses on the internal processes of a person's own judgment in regards to  the  relation within a communicated message. The concept was intended to be an explanatory method designed to detail when  persuasive messages are most likely to succeed.

Attitude change is the fundamental objective of persuasive communication.  SJT seeks to specify the conditions under which this change takes place and predict the direction and extent of the attitude change, while attempting to explain how likely a person might be to change their opinion, the probable direction of that change, their tolerance toward the opinion of others, and their level of commitment to their position.  The SJT researchers claimed expectations regarding attitude change could be based on the message receiver's level of involvement, the structure of the stimulus (and how many alternatives it allows), and the value (credibility) of the source.

Development
SJT arose from social psychology and was based on laboratory findings resulting from experiments.  These experiments studied the mental assessment of physical objects, referred to at the time as psychophysical research.  Subjects were asked to compare some aspect of an object, such as weight or color, to another, different object.  The researchers discovered that, when a standard was provided for comparison, the participants categorized the objects relative to the aspects of the standard. SJT focuses the conceptual structure of the framework and traces its development from the roots in Brunswik's probabilistic functionalism to its present form. 
For example, if a very heavy object was used as the standard in assessing weight, then the other objects would be judged to be relatively lighter than if a very light object was used as the standard.  The standard is referred to as an "anchor".  This work involving physical objects was applied to psychosocial work, in which a participant's limits of acceptability on social issues are studied. Social issues include areas such as religion and politics.

The traditional view of attitude neglects an individual's emotional and motivational influences as well as the social context in which the attitude(s) are formed. Meaning an individual is more likely to assume a speaker with authority will be informative, truthful, relevant, and clear. Wyer and Gruenfeld (1995) noted that "much of our theoretical and empirical knowledge about social information processing has been obtained under laboratory conditions that only faintly resemble the social situations in which information is usually acquired in everyday life".

Judgment process and attitudes
Rooted in judgment theory, which is concerned with the discrimination and categorization of stimuli, it attempts to explain how attitudes are expressed, judged, and modified.  A judgment occurs when a person compares at least two stimuli and makes a choice about them.  With regard to social stimuli specifically, judgment processes incorporate both past experiences and present circumstances. Sherif et al. (1965) defined attitudes as "the stands the individual upholds and cherishes about objects, issues, persons, groups, or institutions" (p. 4). Researchers must infer attitudes from behavior. The behavior can be in response to arranged or naturally occurring stimuli. True attitudes are fundamental to self-identity and are complex, and thus can be difficult to change.

One of the ways in which the SJT developers observed attitudes was through the "Own Categories Questionnaire".  This method requires research participants to place statements into piles of most acceptable, most offensive, neutral, and so on, in order for researchers to infer their attitudes.  This categorization, an observable judgment process, was seen by Sherif and Hovland (1961) as a major component of attitude formation. As a judgment process, categorization and attitude formation are a product of recurring instances, so that past experiences influence decisions regarding aspects of the current situation.  Therefore, attitudes are acquired.

Latitudes of rejection, acceptance, and noncommitment
Social judgment theory also illustrates how people contrast their personal positions on issues to others' positions around them. Aside from having their personal opinion, individuals hold latitudes of what they think is acceptable or unacceptable in general for other people's view. Social attitudes are not cumulative, especially regarding issues where the attitude is extreme. This means that a person may not agree with less extreme stands relative to his or her position, even though they may be in the same direction.  Furthermore, even though two people may seem to hold identical attitudes, their "most preferred" and "least preferred" alternatives may differ.  Thus, a person's full attitude can only be understood in terms of what other positions he or she finds acceptable or unacceptable, in addition to his or her own stand.

Sherif saw an attitude as amalgam of three zones or latitudes.  There is the latitude of acceptance, which is the range of ideas that a person sees as reasonable or worthy of consideration; the latitude of rejection, which is the range of ideas that a person sees as unreasonable or objectionable; and, finally, the latitude of noncommitment, which is the range of ideas that a person sees as neither acceptable nor questionable.

These degrees or latitudes together create the full spectrum of an individual's attitude.  Sherif and Hovland (1961) define the latitude of acceptance as "the range of positions on an issue ... an individual considers acceptable to him (including the one 'most acceptable' to him)" (p. 129).  On the opposite end of the continuum lies the latitude of rejection. This is defined as including the "positions he finds objectionable (including the one 'most objectionable" to him)". This latitude of rejection was deemed essential by the SJT developers in determining an individual's level of involvement and, thus, his or her propensity to an attitude change.  The greater the rejection latitude, the more involved the individual is in the issue and, thus, harder to persuade.

In the middle of these opposites lies the latitude of noncommitment, a range of viewpoints where one feels primarily indifferent.  Sherif claimed that the greater the discrepancy, the more listeners will adjust their attitudes.  Thus, the message that persuades the most is the one that is most discrepant from the listener's position, yet falls within his or her latitude of acceptance or latitude of noncommitment.

Assimilation and contrast
Sometimes people perceive a message that falls within their latitude of rejection as farther from their anchor than it really is; a phenomenon known as contrast.  The opposite of contrast is assimilation, a perceptual error whereby people judge messages that fall within their latitude of acceptance as less discrepant from their anchor than they really are.

These latitudes dictate the likelihood of assimilation and contrast.  When a discrepant viewpoint is expressed in a communication message within the person's latitude of acceptance, the message is more likely to be assimilated or viewed as being closer to person's anchor, or his or her own viewpoint, than it actually is.  When the message is perceived as being very different from one's anchor and, thus, falling within the latitude of rejection, persuasion is unlikely, due to a contrast effect.  The contrast effect is what happens when the message is viewed as being further away than it actually is from the anchor.

Messages falling within the latitude of noncommitment, however, are the ones most likely to achieve the desired attitude change. Therefore, the more extreme an individual's stand, the greater his or her latitude of rejection and, thus, the harder he or she is to persuade.

Ego involvement
The SJT researchers speculated that extreme stands, and thus wide latitudes of rejection, were a result of high ego involvement.  Ego involvement is the importance or centrality of an issue to a person's life, often demonstrated by membership in a group with a known stand.  According to the 1961 Sherif and Hovland work, the level of ego involvement depends upon whether the issue "arouses an intense attitude or, rather, whether the individual can regard the issue with some detachment as primarily a 'factual' matter" (p. 191).  Religion, politics, and family are examples of issues that typically result in highly involved attitudes.  They contribute to one's self-identity.

The concept of involvement is the crux of SJT.  In short, Sherif et al. (1965) speculated that individuals who are highly involved in an issue are more likely to evaluate all possible positions, therefore resulting in an extremely limited or nonexistent latitude of noncommitment.  People who have a deep concern or have extreme opinions on either side of the argument always care deeply and have a large latitude of rejection because they already have their strong opinion formed and usually are not willing to change that.  High involvement also means that individuals will have a more restricted latitude of acceptance. According to SJT, messages falling within the latitude of rejection are unlikely to successfully persuade.  Therefore, highly involved individuals will be harder to persuade, according to SJT.

In opposition, individuals who have less care in the issue, or have a smaller ego involvement, are likely to have a large latitude of acceptance.  Because they are less educated and do not care as much about the issue, they are more likely to easily accept more ideas or opinions about an issue.  This individual will also have a large latitude of noncommitment because, again, if they do not care as much about the topic, they are not going to commit to certain ideas, whether they are on the latitude of rejection or acceptance.  An individual who does not have much ego involvement in an issue will have a small latitude of rejection because they are very open to this new issue and do not have previously formed opinions about it.

Attitude change
To change an attitude, first we must understand the audience's attitudes. Then we will see how it relates to the listeners' judgments of the persuasive messages. It is also essential to judge how close or far away one's position is.  The next step is to shift one's position in response to the argument made.  An individual adjusts an attitude once he or she has judged a new position to be in his or her latitude of acceptance.  If someone judges that message to be in his or her latitude of rejection, they will also adjust their attitude, but in the opposite direction from what they think the speaker is advocating.

Sometimes, an attitude change may be incidental.  In the boomerang effect, an attitude changes in the opposite direction from what the message advocates—the listener is driven away from, rather than drawn to, an idea. This explains why oftentimes fear appeals used in advertising do not work on the audience. As the threat perceived by the audience increases and the capacity to produce the desired effect is low, people will tend to do the opposite of what is advocated. Attitude change can also be influenced by immediate social environment. In the interpersonal domain, people tend to shift their attitudes to align with those of their significant others. The general picture of social influence thus remains one of conformity and alignment attitudes.
A major implication of social judgment theory is that persuasion is difficult to accomplish.  Successful persuasive messages are those that are targeted to the receiver's latitude of acceptance and discrepant from the anchor position, so that the incoming information cannot be assimilated or contrasted. This suggests that even successful attempts at persuasion will yield only small changes in attitude. SJT also suggests persuasion can occur over time with multiple messages.

Simulations
SJT has mainly been tested in small experimental settings, only rarely in more extended ways that include an investigation of opinion changes on a collective level in modeling studies. Stefanelli and Seidel conducted a large-scale simulation of SJT, based on real-life data. They collected survey data from 1302 Swiss citizens, regarding their attitudes towards building a deep-ground-repository for nuclear waste. Attitudes were ranked on three scales: risk, benefit, and process. The data was fed into an agent-based social simulation. In each time-period, two random agents were selected to interact. Their opinions on these three topics (risk, benefit and process) were compared. If they were in the latitude of rejection, the opinions were pushed away from each other; otherwise, the opinions were pulled towards each other. The results showed a four-opinion cluster solution, representing four types of opinions: opposing, supporting, ambivalent, and indifferent.

Alternative models
 Elaboration likelihood model – emphasizes the two routes of persuasion – central (cognitive arguments) and peripheral (emotional influence).
 Social impact theory - emphasizes the number, strength and immediacy of the people trying to influence a person to change their mind.

References

Persuasion
Attitude change